Insulin receptor substrate 4 is a protein that in humans is encoded by the IRS4 gene.

IRS4 encodes the insulin receptor substrate 4, a cytoplasmic protein that contains many potential tyrosine and serine/threonine phosphorylation sites. Tyrosine-phosphorylated IRS4 protein has been shown to associate with cytoplasmic signalling molecules that contain SH2 domains. The IRS4 protein is phosphorylated by the insulin receptor tyrosine kinase upon receptor stimulation.

Interactions
IRS4 has been shown to interact with CRK and NISCH.

References

Further reading